Brian J. Spooner is a Professor of Anthropology, Undergraduate Chair at Department  of Anthropology at the University of Pennsylvania and Curator of Near Eastern Ethnology at the Penn Museum. His many works are on subjects including Cultural and social anthropology; globalization, Islam, Middle East, South Asia, Central Asia; social organization, religion, ethnohistory, ecology, non-industrial economies.

Scientific career 
Professor Spooner joined the faculty at University of Pennsylvania in 1968. He served as the Department of Anthropology's graduate chair 1985-8 and the University's Middle East Center Director from 1986-1995.  He was Interim Co-Director of the Lauder Institute 2010 -2012, and is a Fellow at the Penn Institute of Urban Research and Affiliate Faculty at Penn's Graduate School of Education program on International Education Development.
He has worked in Afghanistan, northwest China, Iran, India, Kazakhstan, Pakistan, Tajikistan, Turkmenistan, and Uzbekistan. His current research focuses on social change under globalization.

References

Living people
People from Ilford
University of Pennsylvania faculty
Alumni of the University of Oxford
British anthropologists
Year of birth missing (living people)
British curators
University of Pennsylvania Museum of Archaeology and Anthropology
Cultural anthropologists